The Red Barbarian is a fictional Marvel Comics villain and the alter ego of Colonel Andre Rostov. First appearing in Tales of Suspense #42 (June, 1963), the Red Barbarian was created by Stan Lee, Robert Bernstein and Don Heck.

Fictional character biography

1960s

The Red Barbarian was a Communist general in an unnamed country, known for his brutality. After an attempt to steal an atomic bomb prototype from Stark Industries is foiled by Iron Man, the Red Barbarian is approached by another Soviet agent known as The Actor who is superior in disguising himself. The duo scheme to steal the secret disintegrator ray blueprints of Tony Stark. The Actor is sent to impersonate Stark and get the plans. The Actor succeeds in doing so, through the means of changing from disguise to disguise, and even learns the secret identity of Iron Man. However, Iron Man manages to get back the classified papers from The Actor and he in return impersonates The Actor impersonating Iron Man and rushes to meet the Red Barbarian. The general is tricked and believes that Iron Man is The Actor in disguise. When he demands for the blueprints, Iron Man replies that the suitcase (in which the blueprints are supposedly in) is booby-trapped and it can only be opened four hours later, and then leaves. Just then, The Actor returns. The Red Barbarian thinks he is the imposter and shoots him, before he can tell the general Iron Man's secret identity.

2010s
The Red Barbarian is missing in action for many years, until he is "revived" (without a prior back story), unaged and acting as a warden (under the name of Colonel Andre Rostov) in the gulag where Bucky Barnes is serving time in for killing two Russian citizens many years back, and tortured Barnes for the information involving "Zephyr codes" for his own profit. He is seen living a life of luxury in the Bahamas until he is assassinated by the Winter Soldier.

Other versions
 The Red Barbarian plays an essential role in the Iron Man and the Armor Wars, a version of the classic Armor Wars storyline.

References
6

External links
 Red Barbarian at the Comic Book Database
Red Barbarian at the Appendix to the Marvel Handbook

Comics characters introduced in 1963
Characters created by Robert Bernstein
Characters created by Don Heck
Characters created by Stan Lee
Fictional generals
Fictional Soviet Army personnel
Fictional Russian people
Fictional Soviet people
Fictional Eastern European people